The 1997 GP Ouest-France was the 61st edition of the GP Ouest-France cycle race and was held on 31 August 1997. The race started and finished in Plouay. The race was won by Andrea Ferrigato of the Roslotto team.

General classification

References

1997
1997 in road cycling
1997 in French sport